The Peru national rugby team, nicknamed los Tumis, is an emerging team in the Americas and a member of the Confederación Sudamericana de Rugby (Consur).

The national side is ranked 72nd in the world, as of 16 January 2023.

History

In 1958 Peru, together with Argentina, Uruguay and Chile participated in the first South American tournament, held in Santiago, Chile. Because there was no IRB-sanctioned rugby union at the time, participation was not officially accepted by Peruvian sport authorities. It would be another 39 years before the Union Peruana de Rugby was formed.

In September, 1999 Peru participated in its first official international tournament: the first under-21 South American tournament in Asuncion, Paraguay.

In November, 2000 Peru participated in the first South American B Championship, in São Paulo, Brazil, with Brazil and Venezuela.

In 2001 they played in the qualifying rounds of the 2003 Rugby World Cup, against Brazil, Venezuela, and Colombia. Their home tie with Colombia was the first Peruvian victory on home soil in an official IRB match.

In the 2007 South American B Championship, played in Peru, Los Tumis won second place. Brazil were champions, with Colombia and Venezuela finishing third and fourth respectively.

In 2010 Peru won the South American B Championship played in Medellin, Colombia gaining their first international title.

Records

Overall

Current squad
Squad to 2018 South American B Championship
Head Coach:  Pablo Vila

See also
Rugby union in Peru
Unión Peruana de Rugby

References

 
South American national rugby union teams